The 1974 SMU Mustangs football team represented Southern Methodist University (SMU) as a member of the Southwest Conference (SWC) during the 1974 NCAA Division I football season. Led by second-year head coach Dave Smith, the Mustangs compiled an overall record of 6–4–1 with a mark of 3–3–1 in conference play, tying for fourth place in the SWC.

Schedule

Roster

References

SMU
SMU Mustangs football seasons
SMU Mustangs football